The office of Vice Prresident of Uzbekistan was a political position in Uzbekistan until it was abolished on January 8, 1992. It was the title of the deputy to the President of Uzbekistan. Shukrullo Mirsaidov was the first and only holder of the office from 24 March 1990 to 8 January 1992.

History 
The position of vice president was introduced on the same day Islam Karimov was elected President of the Uzbek SSR on March 24, 1990 at a session of the Supreme Council of the Uzbek SSR. Uzbekistan at that point became the first union republic to introduce the positions of president and vice president, roles often seen in the west. The only person who served as vice president was Shukrullo Mirsaidov, who, before this position, was the Chairman of the Council of Ministers of the Uzbek SSR. After the abolition of the post of vice president on January 8, 1992, the post of prime minister was introduced in the country.

Functions 
The main function of the vice-president of Uzbekistan was to, in the case of the president's incapacitation, death or resignation and until early elections, assume presidential powers as acting president At the same time, the vice-president of Uzbekistan, jointly headed the Cabinet of Ministers with the president.

Nowadays, article 96 of the Constitution of Uzbekistan states that should the President of the Republic fail to perform his duties due to poor health, confirmed by a certificate of a State Medical Commission formed by the Supreme Assembly of Uzbekistan (Oliy Majlis), an emergency session of the Oliy Majlis shall be held within ten days. The session shall elect an Acting President of the Republic for a term of not more than three months, during which time a presidential election shall be held.

See also
List of leaders of Uzbekistan
President of Uzbekistan
Prime Minister of Uzbekistan

References

Politics of Uzbekistan
Government of Uzbekistan
Vice presidents of Uzbekistan
Uzbekistan
1990 establishments in Uzbekistan
1992 disestablishments in Uzbekistan
Titles held only by one person